The Reel Top 40 Radio Repository, sometimes called REELRADIO, is a virtual museum of radio broadcasts, primarily airchecks from the "Top 40" era of radio in North America.  The archives are available by streaming.  Established in 1996 as the first online airchecks archive, it was transferred to a dedicated not-for-profit organization, REELRADIO, Inc., in 2000.  The site was organized as a series of "collections"; most collections represent the archives of a single contributor.  As of April 2018, the repository featured more than 3,568 exhibits.

Two collections are tribute sites to famed Los Angeles disc jockeys Robert W. Morgan and The Real Don Steele, and the organization also hosts other sites about the Top 40 eras at  WPGC in Washington and WIXY 1260 in Cleveland.

, the board of directors includes founder Richard "Uncle Ricky" Irwin, news reporter Michael Burgess (known as Mike Scott) of KGPE (TV), and Bob Shannon (former vice president of TM Century).

History
The repository was started using SNA's servers, including a RealAudio streaming media server.

Articles about the site were published in Radio World magazine on March 20, 1996 and Radio & Records on September 13, 1996.  Uncle Ricky's Reel Top 40 Radio Repository was one of five Radio category nominees for the 1998 Webby Awards, and an article titled "Radio Patter From The Past: Vintage D.J's Rock On" was published in The New York Times on May 9, 2002.

After SNA was sold to PSINet, the not-for-profit corporation REELRADIO, Inc. was formed on March 23, 2000, with assistance from the Media Preservation Foundation, to collect donations for funding the site; once under the new organization, the site was moved to new hosting facilities in July.

For the first 10 years, the site was supported by voluntary donations.  Despite the website having only a few dozen financial supporters, analysis of user behavior revealed thousands of listeners. The organization's board of directors voted for a minimum contribution of $12/year (later $20/year) for access to most of the site's archives.

In its latter years, Reelradio.com also began including "unscoped" entries in the archives, including full versions of the music played on the air checks. With increased enforcement of royalty fees for streaming music, this also increased costs for the web site, and was a factor in requiring an annual membership fee.

Each week, the web site would list the "Reelradio Fab 40", a list of the top exhibits that were played by listeners to the web site for the prior week. Like the surveys printed by top 40 radio stations in their heyday, the Reelradio Fab 40 list showed an entry's current position on the list, what its position was for each of the previous three weeks, and how many weeks it had been in the Fab 40 list.

By 2016, the web site stated that the membership fee would cover just six months at a time, but by 2017 this requirement was not being enforced. On September 24, 2017, new registrations to the website were closed, and donations were no longer being requested. A statement on the front page of the web site indicated that the Reelradio board of directors had voted to end the site, but would keep it operating while there was still money in its fund to pay licensing fees. Reelradio, Inc. planned to archive and preserve the site until such time that a qualified operator could be found.

The site operators said that the reason for the change was that exhibits were found on the other web site, which violated the terms of membership that prohibited copying exhibits. Furthermore, it was stated that Uncle Ricky was in failing health.

On May 1, 2018 a statement on the front page of the web site was added: "Our board of directors voted to end this site. Our last day of streaming media will be May 1. We will pay all licensing fees for this year. If funding is available, REELRADIO, INC. will archive and preserve the site until a qualified operator can be found, if ever."

This site was offline for almost 3 months until the site returned to normal operations in August 2018. However, there will be no new exhibits for the foreseeable future, according to the site's front page.

Uncle Ricky
Richard Warren "Uncle Ricky" Irwin (January 8, 1951 – June 7, 2018) grew up in Concord, North Carolina and worked at radio stations from age 14.  By the time he started the Reelradio Repository, he had worked for about 10 radio stations and written Commodore 128 software to schedule music for radio stations.  After his work at SNA, Irwin remained a web designer, then became a software engineer.  Irwin died on June 7, 2018.

See also
 Media Preservation Foundation — another similar-minded organization associated with the Repository

References

External links
Official site

History of radio
Works about radio
Media museums in California
Non-profit organizations based in California
Museums established in 1996
Virtual museums
Webcasters
Radio websites
Internet properties established in 1996
Radio organizations in the United States